The Unidad Modelo Station is a station on Line 1 of the Monterrey Metro. It is located on Aztlán Avenue in Monterrey in the heart of the heavy populated Unidad Modelo neighborhood. This station is located in the Colon Avenue in the northeast side of the Monterrey Centre. The station was opened on 25 April 1991 as part of the inaugural section of Line 1, between San Bernabé and Exposición.

This station is accessible for people with disabilities.

The station is named after the neighborhood it is located in, and its logo represents the houses that are located in the zone.

References

Metrorrey stations